Matsuo Dam  is a gravity dam located in Mie Prefecture in Japan. The dam is used for flood control. The catchment area of the dam is 10.1 km2. The dam impounds about 10  ha of land when full and can store 349 thousand cubic meters of water. The construction of the dam was started on 1951 and completed in 1963.

See also
List of dams in Japan

References

Dams in Mie Prefecture